Zheng Jiaqi (born January 13, 1988) is an American table tennis player. She had competed at the 2016 Summer Olympics as part of the American team in the women's team event.

References

1988 births
Living people
American female table tennis players
American sportspeople of Chinese descent
Olympic table tennis players of the United States
Table tennis players at the 2016 Summer Olympics
Pan American Games medalists in table tennis
Pan American Games gold medalists for the United States
Table tennis players from Shandong
People from Zaozhuang
Naturalised table tennis players
Table tennis players at the 2015 Pan American Games
Medalists at the 2015 Pan American Games
21st-century American women